Approved by the Motors is the second studio album by English rock band the Motors, originally released in May 1978. The album only spent 1 week in the UK Albums Charts reaching number 60. Four singles came from the album, "Airport", "Forget About You", "Today" and "Sensation". The former two were the only successful singles from the album.

Background and production
The Motors had just completed a 5-week tour of the US when they started recording the album on 1 February 1978. The album was produced by Peter Ker and the two main songwriters in the group, Nick Garvey and Andy McMaster. It was mostly recorded at  Pathway Studios, London and engineered by Andy Miller at IBC Studios and Pathway Studios, Basing Street Studios, Olympic Studios. This album used some material that had been written by McMaster and Garvey before the band had formed the year before. The album cover was designed by Cooke Key Associates.

Critical reception

In a contemporary review for Rolling Stone, Jim Farber praised Approved by the Motors as "a near-perfect LP of pure, pulverizing pop in the best Sweet, Slade, and Pilot tradition, cutting through the cuteness of that genre with Nick Garvey's and Andy McMaster's dynamic dual vocals… the band sings sweetly about S&M activities, disarming the entire subject in the same endearing manner as Cheap Trick joyously trivializes suicide." Robert Christgau of The Village Voice found the album to be "an enormous improvement" over the band's debut.

AllMusic critic Chris Woodstra retrospectively wrote that Approved by the Motors "shows a marked improvement over their debut, with a stronger melodic base and catchier songs". It has since been published by Rolling Stone as one of "20 Rock Albums Rolling Stone Loved in the 1970s That You Never Heard".

Record Collector magazine's Joe Geesin said of the album:

Track listing

Charts

Personnel
The Motors
Nick Garvey - vocals, guitar, bass
Bram Tchaikovsky - vocals, guitar
Andy McMaster - vocals, bass, keyboards
Ricky Slaughter (Ricky Wernham) - drums

References

1978 albums
The Motors albums
Virgin Records albums
Albums recorded at IBC Studios
Albums recorded at Olympic Sound Studios